Urban prairie is a term to describe vacant urban land that has reverted to green space. Previous structures occupying the urban lots have been demolished, leaving patchy areas of green space that are usually untended and unmanaged, forming an involuntary park. Sometimes, however, the prairie spaces are intentionally created to facilitate amenities, such as green belts, community gardens and wildlife reserve habitats.

History

Urban prairies can result from several factors. The value of aging buildings may fall too low to provide financial incentives for their owners to maintain them. Vacant properties may have resulted from deurbanization or crime, or may have been seized by local government as a response to unpaid property taxes. Since vacant structures can pose health and safety threats (such as fire hazards), or be used as a location for criminal activity, cities often demolish them.

Sometimes areas are cleared of buildings as part of a revitalization plan with the intention of redeveloping the land. In flood-prone areas, government agencies may purchase developed lots and then demolish the structures to improve drainage during floods. Some neighborhoods near major industrial or environmental clean-up sites are acquired and leveled to create a buffer zone and minimize the risks associated with pollution or industrial accidents. Such areas may become nothing more than fields of overgrown vegetation, which then provide habitat for wildlife. Sometimes it is possible for residents of the city to fill up the unplanned empty space with urban parks or community gardens.
Urban prairie is sometimes planned by the government or non-profit groups for community gardens and conservation, to restore or reintroduce a wildlife habitat, help the environment, and educate people about the prairie. Detroit, Michigan is one particular city that has many urban prairies.

In the case of the city of Christchurch in New Zealand, earthquake damage from the 2011 earthquake caused the underground water table to raise and leak significantly in places, preventing reconstruction of damaged buildings. Many former residential areas in eastern Christchurch suburbs have been purchased by the government and demolished, as the soft soil causes the houses to shift and pose significant danger to the inhabitants. It is unknown if many of the waterlogged areas of Christchurch will ever fully recover.

Urban prairies may be established to lower the burden of mowing and related upkeep by the governmental entity that is overseeing it, letting weeds develop.

References

External links

City of Des Moines Urban Prairie Project

Urban studies and planning terminology
Prairie
Prairies
Urban decay
Ecology
Rewilding